Into the Wide is the fourth full-length studio album by the band Delta Spirit, released in 2014. It is the band's first album on Dualtone Records.

Track listing

 Deluxe Edition - Released June 29, 2015

Personnel
Matthew Vasquez - vocals, guitars
Kelly Winrich - keys, programming, guitars, percussion, lapsteel, dronebox, bg's
William Mclaren - guitars, bg's
Johnathan Jameson - bass, bg's
Brandon Young - drums, percussion, bg's

Charts

References

2014 albums
Delta Spirit albums
Dualtone Records albums